The 2022 TC2000 Championship was the 44th season of Turismo Competición 2000, the premier touring car category of Argentina. It was the first season following it's reversion to the TC2000 moniker after ten years as Súper TC2000.

Calendar

Teams and drivers

Results and standings

Results summary

Championship standings
Points system

Drivers' championship

Notes

References

External links
Series website

TC2000
TC2000